Donald William Naddy (January 12, 1917 – February 2017) was an American politician in the state of South Dakota who was a member of the South Dakota House of Representatives from 1959 to 1966. Naddy was an alumnus of the Northern State University and a teacher. He also was a town clerk of Britton, South Dakota. He died aged 100 in 2017.

References

1917 births
2017 deaths
People from Marshall County, South Dakota
Northern State University alumni
Democratic Party members of the South Dakota House of Representatives
People from Britton, South Dakota
American centenarians
Men centenarians